L'Rain is the self-titled debut studio album by experimental musician Taja Cheek, who performs as L'Rain. The album was released in 2017 by New York City-based label Astro Nautico and included in best-of-year lists by publications including Pitchfork and Bandcamp Daily. The album cover is an image of Cheek's forearm, which is tattooed "L'Rain"; she chose the name after her mother, Lorraine, died during the making of the record.

L'Rain features Andrew Lappin on guitars, Alex Goldberg on drums and percussion, Jeremy Powell on saxophone, and TV on the Radio's Kyp Malone on backing vocals. Cheek composed and performs vocals, keyboards, synthesizers, guitar, bass, samples, and percussion on the album, which she co-produced with Lappin.

Musical style
L'Rain has been recognized as an experimental album drawing on many traditions and genres; reviewers have identified the work's style and influences as including free jazz, ambient, noise music, and disco; R&B, post-punk, and avant-garde rock; shoegaze, psychedelic, hip hop, and outsider music; jazz, electronic music, and dream pop; soul and folk; and more.

L'Rain often layers and loops her vocals, and her work frequently features samples from her collection of hundreds of field recordings, some pitch-shifted or otherwise manipulated beyond recognition. She has spoken in interviews about her work's tendency to evade or reject categorization, and in an interview following the debut's release said, "I would hope that people would find elements of gospel, 90s r&b, and different genres of 'experimental music' (for lack of a better term) in my music, but I generally try to remain as illegible as possible. There is power in remaining indiscernible. I like to exist in a liminal space."

Critical reception

Jay Balfour for Pitchfork assessed L'Rain with general positivity, calling it "a beautiful, untidy conduit of [Cheek's] grieving."

Year-end lists

Track listing
All songs by L'Rain.

Personnel
Adapted from the record's Bandcamp page.

L'Rain
 Taja Cheek - vocals, bass guitar, electric guitar, percussion, samples, synths

Additional musicians
 Alex Goldberg - drums, percussion
 Andrew Lappin - acoustic guitar, electric guitar, nylon guitar, percussion, programming
 Jeremy Powell - saxophone
 Kyp Malone - background vocals

Technical
 Taja Cheek - production
 Jake Aron - mixing
 Chris Connors - additional mixing, vocal editing   
 Chris Gehringer - mastering 
 Andrew Lappin - engineering, mixing, production
 Sam Obey - A&R, remix mastering, sequencing 

Artwork and design
 Jed Moch - album artwork 
 Carlos Reyes - album artwork

References  

2017 debut albums